John William "Noel" Kelehan (26 December 1935 – 6 February 2012) was an Irish musician, former conductor of the RTÉ Concert Orchestra and former musical director of Radio Telefís Éireann.  He retired as conductor in 1998.

Life and career
As well as being an accomplished jazz pianist, he was most famous for being the conductor of many Irish entries to the Eurovision Song Contest, beginning in 1966 and ending in 1998. He conducted five winning Irish entries, in 1980, 1987, 1992, 1993, and 1996.  In 1994, the winning song was performed without orchestral accompaniment. However, an entry rated second that year, "To nie ja!" performed by Edyta Górniak from Poland, was also conducted by Kelehan. He also conducted the entry from Bosnia and Herzegovina in 1993. In total, Kelehan conducted 29 Eurovision entries, 24 of them Irish. In 1999, after Kelehan retired, the use of an orchestra was discontinued at the Contest.

He died at the age of 76, in Dublin on 6 February 2012, after a long illness. His funeral took place in Dublin on 9 February 2012.

Performance credits
Kelehan had several records to his credit; most notably, with the Noel Kelehan Quintet he recorded the album "Ozone" in 1979.   In 1984 he wrote the string arrangements for songs The Unforgettable Fire and Bad from U2's album The Unforgettable Fire.

References

1935 births
2012 deaths
Disease-related deaths in the Republic of Ireland
Eurovision Song Contest conductors
Irish conductors (music)
Irish jazz musicians
Irish pianists
Mainstream jazz pianists
RTÉ Performing Groups
20th-century Irish pianists
20th-century conductors (music)